The Journal of the Chemical Society of Pakistan is a bimonthly peer-reviewed scientific journal covering the field of chemistry. It is published by the Chemical Society of Pakistan and was established in 1978. The editor-in-chief is Muhammad Iqbal Bhanger (University of Karachi). The journal is abstracted and indexed in  the Science Citation Index Expanded and Current Contents/Physical, Chemical & Earth Sciences.

References

External links 
 

Chemistry journals
Bimonthly journals
Academic journals published by learned and professional societies
Publications established in 1978
English-language journals